Mount Sherman is an unincorporated community located in LaRue County, Kentucky, United States. The community is concentrated around the intersection of Kentucky Route 61 and Kentucky Route 1906, southeast of Hodgenville.  The zip code is: 42764.

Notable person
 Hi Bell, professional baseball pitcher and 2-time World Series champion

Notes

Unincorporated communities in Kentucky
Unincorporated communities in LaRue County, Kentucky